Camille Biot (19 December 1850, Châtenoy-le-Royal - 1918, Mâcon) was a French physician who is remembered for describing Biot's respiration.

Biography 
Camille Biot was born in Chatenoy-le-Royal, Saône-et-Loire, France in 1850. He made observations about breathing patterns while working as an intern at the Hôtel Dieu Hospital in Lyon, which were published in 1876. After 1875 he practised medicine in Mâcon.

References 

19th-century French physicians
1850 births
1918 deaths
20th-century French physicians